Judy Garland (born Frances Ethel Gumm; June 10, 1922June 22, 1969) was an American actress and singer. While critically acclaimed for many different roles throughout her career, she is widely known for playing the part of Dorothy Gale in The Wizard of Oz (1939). She attained international stardom as an actress in both musical and dramatic roles, as a recording artist and on the concert stage. Renowned for her versatility, she received an Academy Juvenile Award, a Golden Globe Award and a Special Tony Award. Garland was the first woman to win the Grammy Award for Album of the Year, which she won for her 1961 live recording titled Judy at Carnegie Hall.

Garland began performing as a child with her two older sisters, in a vaudeville group "The Gumm Sisters" and was later signed to Metro-Goldwyn-Mayer as a teenager. She appeared in more than two dozen films for MGM. Garland was a frequent on-screen partner of both Mickey Rooney and Gene Kelly and regularly collaborated with director and second husband Vincente Minnelli. Other starring roles during this period included Meet Me in St. Louis (1944), The Harvey Girls (1946), Easter Parade (1948) and Summer Stock (1950). In 1950, after 15 years with MGM, the studio released her amid a series of personal struggles that prevented her from fulfilling the terms of her contract.

Although her film career became intermittent thereafter, two of Garland's most critically acclaimed roles came later in her career: she received a nomination for the Academy Award for Best Actress for her performance in A Star Is Born (1954) and a nomination for Best Supporting Actress for her performance in Judgment at Nuremberg (1961). She also made record-breaking concert appearances, released eight studio albums and hosted her own Emmy-nominated television series, The Judy Garland Show (1963–1964). At age 39, Garland became the youngest and first female recipient of the Cecil B. DeMille Award for lifetime achievement in the film industry. In 1997, Garland was posthumously awarded the Grammy Lifetime Achievement Award. Several of her recordings have been inducted into the Grammy Hall of Fame and in 1999, the American Film Institute ranked her as the eighth-greatest female screen legend of classic Hollywood cinema.

Garland struggled in her personal life from an early age. The pressures of early stardom affected her physical and mental health from the time she was a teenager; her self-image was influenced by constant criticism from film executives who believed that she was physically unattractive and who manipulated her onscreen physical appearance. Throughout her adulthood she was plagued by alcohol and substance abuse, as well as financial instability, often owing hundreds of thousands of dollars in back taxes. Her lifelong substance use disorder ultimately led to her death from an accidental barbiturate overdose in 1969, at age 47.

Early life

Garland was born Frances Ethel Gumm on June 10, 1922, in Grand Rapids, Minnesota. She was the youngest child of Ethel Marion ( Milne; 1893–1953) and Francis Avent "Frank" Gumm (1886–1935). Her parents were vaudevillians who settled in Grand Rapids to run a movie theater that featured vaudeville acts. She was of Irish, English, Scottish, and French Huguenot ancestry, named after both of her parents and baptized at a local Episcopal church.

"Baby" (as she was called by her parents and sisters) shared her family's flair for song and dance. Her first appearance came at the age of two, when she joined her elder sisters Mary Jane "Suzy/Suzanne" Gumm and Dorothy Virginia "Jimmie" Gumm on the stage of her father's movie theater during a Christmas show and sang a chorus of "Jingle Bells". The Gumm Sisters performed there for the next few years, accompanied by their mother on piano.

The family relocated to Lancaster, California, in June 1926, following rumors that her father had homosexual inclinations. Frank bought and operated another theater in Lancaster, and Ethel began managing her daughters and working to get them into motion pictures.

Early career

The Gumm/Garland Sisters

In 1928, the Gumm Sisters enrolled in a dance school run by Ethel Meglin, proprietor of the Meglin Kiddies dance troupe. They appeared with the troupe at its annual Christmas show. Through the Meglin Kiddies, they made their film debut in a short subject called The Big Revue (1929), where they performed a song-and-dance number called "That's the Good Old Sunny South". This was followed by appearances in two Vitaphone shorts the following year: A Holiday in Storyland (featuring Garland's first on-screen solo) and The Wedding of Jack and Jill. They next appeared together in Bubbles. Their final on-screen appearance was in an MGM Technicolor short entitled La Fiesta de Santa Barbara (1935).

The trio had toured the vaudeville circuit as "The Gumm Sisters" for many years by the time they performed in Chicago at the Oriental Theater with George Jessel in 1934. He encouraged the group to choose a more appealing name after "Gumm" was met with laughter from the audience. According to theater legend, their act was once erroneously billed at a Chicago theater as "The Glum Sisters".

Several stories persist regarding the origin of their use of the name Garland. One is that it was originated by Jessel after Carole Lombard's character Lily Garland in the film Twentieth Century (1934), which was then playing at the Oriental in Chicago; another is that the girls chose the surname after drama critic Robert Garland. Garland's daughter Lorna Luft stated that her mother selected the name when Jessel announced that the trio "looked prettier than a garland of flowers". A TV special was filmed in Hollywood at the Pantages Theatre premiere of A Star Is Born on September 29, 1954, in which Jessel stated:

A later explanation surfaced when Jessel was a guest on Garland's television show in 1963. He said that he had sent actress Judith Anderson a telegram containing the word "garland" and it stuck in his mind. However, Garland asked Jessel just moments later if this story was true and he blithely replied "No".

By late 1934, the Gumm Sisters had changed their name to the Garland Sisters. Frances changed her name to "Judy" soon after, inspired by a popular Hoagy Carmichael song. The group broke up by August 1935, when Suzanne Garland flew to Reno, Nevada and married musician Lee Kahn, a member of the Jimmy Davis orchestra playing at Cal-Neva Lodge, Lake Tahoe.

Signed at Metro-Goldwyn-Mayer

In September 1935, Louis B. Mayer asked songwriter Burton Lane to go to the Orpheum Theater in downtown Los Angeles to watch the Garland Sisters' vaudeville act and to report to him. A few days later, Judy and her father were brought for an impromptu audition at Metro-Goldwyn-Mayer Studios in Culver City. Garland performed "Zing! Went the Strings of My Heart" and "Eli, Eli", a Yiddish song written in 1896 and regularly performed in vaudeville. The studio immediately signed Garland to a contract with MGM, presumably without a screen test, though she had made a test for the studio several months earlier. The studio did not know what to do with her; aged thirteen, she was older than the traditional child star, but too young for adult roles.

Her physical appearance was a dilemma for MGM. She was only  and her "cute" or "girl-next-door" looks did not exemplify the most glamorous persona then required of leading female performers. She was self-conscious and anxious about her appearance. Garland went to school at Metro with Ava Gardner, Lana Turner, Elizabeth Taylor, "real beauties", said Charles Walters, who directed her in a number of films. "Judy was the big money-maker at the time, a big success, but she was the ugly duckling ... I think it had a very damaging effect on her emotionally for a long time. I think it lasted forever, really." Her insecurity was exacerbated by the attitude of studio chief Mayer, who referred to her as his "little hunchback".

During her early years at the studio, she was photographed and dressed in plain garments or frilly juvenile gowns and costumes to match the "girl-next-door" image created for her. They had her wear removable caps on her teeth and rubberized discs to reshape her nose. Eventually, on the set of Meet Me in St. Louis when she was 21 years old, Garland met Dorothy "Dottie" Ponedel, a makeup artist who worked at MGM. After reviewing the additions to her look, Garland was surprised when Ponedel said that the caps and discs that Garland had been using were not needed, as she was "a pretty girl". Ponedel became Garland's makeup artist. The work that Ponedel did on Garland for Meet Me in St. Louis made Garland so happy that Ponedel became Garland's advisor every time she worked on a film for MGM.

On November 16, 1935, 13-year-old Garland was in the midst of preparing for a radio performance on the Shell Chateaux Hour when she learned that her father had been hospitalized with meningitis and had taken a turn for the worse. Frank Gumm died the following morning at age 49, leaving her devastated.

Her song for the Shell Chateau Hour was her first professional rendition of "Zing! Went the Strings of My Heart", a song which became a standard in many of her concerts. Garland performed at various studio functions and was eventually cast opposite Deanna Durbin in the musical-short Every Sunday (1936). The film contrasted her vocal range and swing style with Durbin's operatic soprano and served as an extended screen test for them, as studio executives were questioning the wisdom of having two girl singers on the roster.

Judy's first feature-length film was on a loan-out to Fox titled "Pigskin Parade" a football-themed musical comedy where she was billed tenth after Stuart Erwin, Jack Haley, Patsy Kelly, Betty Grable and others. Judy sang three solos including "The Texas Tornado" and "The Balboa". 

Garland came to the attention of studio executives when she sang a special arrangement of "You Made Me Love You (I Didn't Want to Do It)" to Clark Gable at a birthday party that the studio arranged for the actor. Her rendition was so well regarded that she performed the song in the all-star extravaganza Broadway Melody of 1938 (1937), when she sang to a photograph of him.

MGM hit on a winning formula when it paired Garland with Mickey Rooney in a string of what were known as "backyard musicals". The duo first appeared together as supporting characters in the B movie Thoroughbreds Don't Cry (1937). Garland was then put in the cast of the fourth of the Hardy Family movies as a literal girl-next-door to Rooney's character Andy Hardy, in Love Finds Andy Hardy (1938), although Hardy's love interest was played by Lana Turner. They teamed as lead characters for the first time in Babes in Arms (1939), ultimately appearing in five additional films, including Hardy films Andy Hardy Meets Debutante (1940) and Life Begins for Andy Hardy (1941).

Garland stated that she, Rooney and other young performers were constantly prescribed amphetamines to stay awake and keep up with the frantic pace of making one film after another. They were also given barbiturates to take before going to bed so they could sleep. This regular use of drugs, she said, led to addiction and a life-long struggle. She later resented the hectic schedule and believed MGM stole her youth. Rooney, however, denied their studio was responsible for her addiction: "Judy Garland was never given any drugs by Metro-Goldwyn-Mayer. Mr. Mayer didn't sanction anything for Judy. No one on that lot was responsible for Judy Garland's death. Unfortunately, Judy chose that path."

Garland's weight was within a healthy range, but the studio demanded she constantly diet. They even went so far as to serve her only a bowl of soup and a plate of lettuce when she ordered a regular meal. She was plagued with self-doubt throughout her life; despite successful film and recording careers, awards, critical praise and her ability to fill concert halls worldwide, she required constant reassurance that she was talented and attractive.

The Wizard of Oz

In 1938 when she was sixteen, Garland was cast as the young Dorothy Gale in The Wizard of Oz (1939), a film based on the 1900 children's book by L. Frank Baum. In the film, she sang the song with which she would be constantly identified afterward, "Over the Rainbow". Although producers Arthur Freed and Mervyn LeRoy had wanted to cast her in the role from the beginning, studio chief Mayer first tried to borrow Shirley Temple from 20th Century Fox, but they declined. Deanna Durbin was then asked, but was unavailable; this resulted in Garland being cast.

Garland was initially outfitted in a blonde wig for the part, but Freed and LeRoy decided against it shortly into filming. Her blue gingham dress was chosen for its blurring effect on her figure, which made her look younger. Shooting commenced on October 13, 1938, and it was completed on March 16, 1939, with a final cost of more than $2 million (equivalent to $ million in ). With the conclusion of filming, MGM kept Garland busy with promotional tours and the shooting of Babes in Arms (also 1939), directed by Busby Berkeley. She and Rooney were sent on a cross-country promotional tour, culminating in the August 17 New York City premiere at the Capitol Theater, which included a five-show-a-day appearance schedule for the two stars.

Reports of Garland being put on a diet consisting of cigarettes, chicken soup and coffee are erroneous; as clarified in the book The Road to Oz: The Evolution, Creation and Legacy of a Motion Picture Masterpiece by historians Jay Scarfone and William Stillman, at that time Garland was an anti-smoker and she was allowed solid food. However, in a further attempt to minimize her curves, her diet was accompanied by swimming and hiking outings, plus games of tennis and badminton with her stunt double Bobbie Koshay.

The Wizard of Oz was a tremendous critical success, though its high budget and promotions costs of an estimated $4 million (equivalent to $ million in ), coupled with the lower revenue that was generated by discounted children's tickets, meant that the film did not return a profit until it was re-released in the 1940s and on subsequent occasions. At the 1939 Academy Awards ceremony, Garland received her only Academy Award, an Academy Juvenile Award for her performances in 1939, including The Wizard of Oz and Babes in Arms. She was the fourth person to receive the award as well as only one of twelve in history to ever be presented with one. After the film, Garland was one of the most bankable actresses in the United States.

Adult stardom

Garland starred in three films released in 1940: Andy Hardy Meets Debutante, Strike Up the Band and Little Nellie Kelly. In the last, she played her first adult role, a dual role of both mother and daughter. Little Nellie Kelly was purchased from George M. Cohan as a vehicle for her to display both her audience appeal and her physical appearance. The role was a challenge for her, requiring the use of an accent, her first adult kiss and the only death scene of her career. Her co-star George Murphy regarded the kiss as embarrassing. He said it felt like "a hillbilly with a child bride".

During this time, Garland was still in her teens when she experienced her first serious adult romance with bandleader Artie Shaw. She was deeply devoted to him and was devastated in early 1940 when he eloped with Lana Turner. Garland began a relationship with musician David Rose and on her 18th birthday, he gave her an engagement ring. The studio intervened because, at the time, he was still married to actress and singer Martha Raye. They agreed to wait a year to allow for his divorce to become final. During that time, Garland had a brief affair with songwriter Johnny Mercer. After her breakup with Mercer, Garland and Rose were wed on July 27, 1941. "A true rarity" is what media called it. The couple agreed to a trial separation in January 1943 and divorced in 1944.

In 1941, Garland had an abortion while pregnant with Rose's child at the insistence of her mother and the studio since the pregnancy wasn't approved. She had a second one in 1943 when she became pregnant from her affair with Tyrone Power.

In her next film, For Me and My Gal (1942), Garland performed with Gene Kelly in his first screen appearance. She was given the "glamor treatment" in Presenting Lily Mars (1943), in which she was dressed in "grown-up" gowns. Her lightened hair was also pulled up in a stylish fashion. However, no matter how glamorous or beautiful she appeared on screen or in photographs, she was never confident in her appearance and never escaped the "girl-next-door" image that the studio had created for her.

One of Garland's most successful films for MGM was Meet Me in St. Louis (1944), in which she introduced three standards: "The Trolley Song", "The Boy Next Door" and "Have Yourself a Merry Little Christmas". This was one of the first films in her career that gave her the opportunity to be the attractive leading lady. Vincente Minnelli was assigned to direct and he requested that make-up artist Dorothy Ponedel be assigned to Garland. Ponedel refined her appearance in several ways, including extending and reshaping her eyebrows, changing her hairline, modifying her lip line and removing her nose discs and dental caps. She appreciated the results so much that Ponedel was written into her contract for all her remaining pictures at MGM.

At this time, Garland had a brief affair with film director Orson Welles, who at that time was married to Rita Hayworth. The affair ended in early 1945 and they remained on good terms afterwards.

During the filming of Meet Me in St. Louis, Garland and Minnelli had some initial conflict between them, but they entered into a relationship and married on June 15, 1945. On March 12, 1946, daughter Liza was born. The couple divorced by 1951.

The Clock (1945) was Garland's first straight dramatic film; Robert Walker was cast in the main male role. Though the film was critically praised and earned a profit, most movie fans expected her to sing. She did not act again in a non-singing dramatic role for many years. Garland's other films of the 1940s include The Harvey Girls (1946), in which she introduced the Academy Award-winning song "On the Atchison, Topeka and the Santa Fe" and Till the Clouds Roll By (1946).

Last MGM motion pictures
In April 1948, during filming for The Pirate, Garland suffered a nervous breakdown and was placed in a private sanatorium. She was able to complete filming, but in July she made her first suicide attempt, making minor cuts to her wrist with a broken glass. During this period, she spent two weeks in treatment at the Austen Riggs Center, a psychiatric hospital in Stockbridge, Massachusetts. The Pirate was released in May 1948 and was the first film in which Garland had starred since The Wizard of Oz not to make a profit. The main reasons for its failure were not only its cost, but also the increasing expense of the shooting delays while Garland was ill, as well as the general public's unwillingness to accept her in a sophisticated film. Following her work on The Pirate, she co-starred for the first and only time with Fred Astaire (who replaced Gene Kelly after Kelly had broken his ankle) in Easter Parade (1948), which became her top-grossing film at MGM.

Thrilled by the huge box-office receipts of Easter Parade, MGM immediately teamed Garland and Astaire in The Barkleys of Broadway. During the initial filming, Garland was taking prescription barbiturate sleeping pills along with illicitly obtained pills containing morphine. Around this time, she also developed a serious problem with alcohol. These, in combination with migraine headaches, led her to miss several shooting days in a row. After being advised by her doctor that she would only be able to work in four- to five-day increments with extended rest periods between, MGM executive Arthur Freed made the decision to suspend her on July 18, 1948. She was replaced in the film by Ginger Rogers.

When her suspension was over, she was summoned back to work and ultimately performed two songs as a guest in the Rodgers and Hart biopic Words and Music (1948), which was her last appearance with Mickey Rooney. Despite the all-star cast, Words and Music barely broke even at the box office. Having regained her strength, as well as some needed weight during her suspension, Garland felt much better and in the fall of 1948, she returned to MGM to replace a pregnant June Allyson for the musical film In the Good Old Summertime (1949) co-starring Van Johnson. Although she was sometimes late arriving at the studio during the making of this picture, she managed to complete it five days ahead of schedule. Her daughter Liza made her film debut at the age of two and a half at the end of the film. In the Good Old Summertime was enormously successful at the box office.

Garland was then cast in the film adaptation of Annie Get Your Gun in the title role of Annie Oakley. She was nervous at the prospect of taking on a role strongly identified with Ethel Merman, anxious about appearing in an unglamorous part after breaking from juvenile parts for several years and disturbed by her treatment at the hands of director Busby Berkeley. Berkeley was staging all the musical numbers and was severe with Garland's lack of effort, attitude and enthusiasm. She complained to Mayer, trying to have Berkeley fired from the feature. She began arriving late to the set and sometimes failed to appear. At this time, she was also undergoing electroconvulsive therapy for depression. She was fired from the picture on May 10, 1949 and was replaced by Betty Hutton, who stepped in to  perform all the musical routines as staged by Berkeley.
Garland underwent an extensive hospital stay at Peter Bent Brigham Hospital in Boston, Massachusetts, in which she was weaned off her medication and after a while, was able to eat and sleep normally.

Garland returned to Los Angeles heavier and in the fall of 1949, was cast opposite Gene Kelly in Summer Stock (1950). The film took six months to complete. To lose weight, Garland went back on the pills and the familiar pattern resurfaced. She began showing up late or not at all. When principal photography on Summer Stock was completed in the spring of 1950, it was decided that Garland needed an additional musical number. She agreed to do it provided the song should be "Get Happy". In addition, she insisted that director Charles Walters choreograph and stage the number. By that time, Garland had lost 15 pounds and looked more slender. "Get Happy" was the last segment of Summer Stock to be filmed. It was her final picture for MGM. When it was released in the fall of 1950, Summer Stock drew big crowds and racked up very respectable box-office receipts, but because of the costly shooting delays caused by Garland, the film posted a loss of $80,000 to the studio.

Garland was cast in the film Royal Wedding with Fred Astaire after June Allyson became pregnant in 1950. She failed to report to the set on multiple occasions and the studio suspended her contract on June 17, 1950. She was replaced by Jane Powell. Reputable biographies following her death stated that after this latest dismissal, she slightly grazed her neck with a broken glass, requiring only a Band-Aid, but at the time, the public was informed that a despondent Garland had slashed her throat. "All I could see ahead was more confusion", Garland later said of this suicide attempt. "I wanted to black out the future as well as the past. I wanted to hurt myself and everyone who had hurt me." In September 1950, after 15 years with the studio, Garland and MGM parted company.

Later career

Appearances on Bing Crosby's radio show

Garland was a frequent guest on Kraft Music Hall, hosted by her friend Bing Crosby. Following Garland's second suicide attempt, Crosby, knowing that she was depressed and running out of money, invited her on to his radio showthe first of the new seasonon October 11, 1950.

Garland made eight appearances during the 1950–51 season of The Bing Crosby – Chesterfield Show, which immediately reinvigorated her career. Soon after, she toured for four months to sellout crowds in Europe.

Renewed stardom on the stage

In 1951, Garland began a four-month concert tour of Britain and Ireland, where she played to sold-out audiences throughout England, Scotland and Ireland. The successful concert tour was the first of her many comebacks, with performances centered on songs by Al Jolson and revival of vaudevillian "tradition". Garland performed complete shows as tributes to Jolson in her concerts at the London Palladium in April and at New York's Palace Theater later that year.

Garland said after the Palladium show: "I suddenly knew that this was the beginning of a new life ... Hollywood thought I was through; then came the wonderful opportunity to appear at the London Palladium, where I can truthfully say Judy Garland was reborn." Her appearances at the Palladium lasted for four weeks, where she received rave reviews and an ovation described by the Palladium manager as the loudest he had ever heard.

Garland's engagement at the Palace Theatre in Manhattan in October 1951 exceeded all previous records for the theater and for Garland and was called "one of the greatest personal triumphs in show business history". Garland was honored with a Special Tony Award for her contribution to the revival of vaudeville.

Garland divorced Minnelli that same year. On June 8, 1952, she married Sidney Luft, her tour manager and producer, in Hollister, California. On November 21, 1952, Garland gave birth to daughter Lorna Luft, who herself became an actress and singer. On March 29, 1955, she gave birth to son Joey Luft.

Hollywood comeback

Garland appeared with James Mason in the Warner Bros. film A Star Is Born (1954), the first remake of the 1937 film. She and Sidney Luft, her then-husband, produced the film through their production company, Transcona Enterprises, while Warner Bros. supplied finances, production facilities and crew. Directed by George Cukor, it was a large undertaking to which she initially fully dedicated herself.

As shooting progressed, however, she began making the same pleas of illness that she had so often made during her final films at MGM. Production delays led to cost overruns and angry confrontations with Warner Bros. head Jack L. Warner. Principal photography wrapped on March 17, 1954. At Luft's suggestion, the "Born in a Trunk" medley was filmed as a showcase for her and inserted over director Cukor's objections, who feared the additional length would lead to cuts in other areas. It was completed on July 29.

Upon its world premiere on September 29, 1954, the film was met with critical and popular acclaim. Before its release, it was edited at the instruction of Jack Warner; theater operators, concerned that they were losing money because they were only able to run the film for three or four shows per day instead of five or six, pressured the studio to make additional reductions. After its first-run engagements, about 30 minutes of footage were cut, sparking outrage among critics and filmgoers. Although it was still popular, drawing huge crowds and grossing over $6 million in its first release, A Star is Born did not make back its cost and ended up losing money. As a result, the secure financial position Garland had expected from the profits did not materialize. Transcona made no more films with Warner.

Garland was nominated for the Academy Award for Best Actress and, in the run-up to the 27th Academy Awards, was generally expected to win for A Star Is Born. She could not attend the ceremony because she had just given birth to son Joseph Luft, so a television crew was in her hospital room with cameras and wires to broadcast her anticipated acceptance speech. The Oscar was won, however, by Grace Kelly for The Country Girl (1954). The camera crew was packing up before Kelly could even reach the stage. Groucho Marx sent Garland a telegram after the awards ceremony, declaring her loss "the biggest robbery since Brinks". Time labeled her performance as "just about the greatest one-woman show in modern movie history". Garland won the Golden Globe Award for Best Actress in a Musical for the role.

Garland's films after A Star Is Born included Judgment at Nuremberg (1961) (for which she was Oscar- and Golden Globe-nominated for Best Supporting Actress), the animated feature Gay Purr-ee (1962) and A Child Is Waiting (1963) with Burt Lancaster. Her final film was I Could Go On Singing (1963), co-starring Dirk Bogarde.

Television, concerts and Carnegie Hall

Garland appeared in a number of television specials beginning in 1955. The first was the 1955 debut episode of Ford Star Jubilee; this was the first full-scale color broadcast ever on CBS and was a ratings triumph, scoring a 34.8 Nielsen rating. She signed a three-year, $300,000 contract with the network. Only one additional special was broadcast in 1956, a live concert-edition of General Electric Theater, before the relationship between the Lufts and CBS broke down in a dispute over the planned format of upcoming specials.

In 1956, Garland performed for four weeks at the New Frontier Hotel on the Las Vegas Strip for a salary of $55,000 per week, making her the highest-paid entertainer to work in Las Vegas. Despite a brief bout of laryngitis, where for one performance Jerry Lewis filled in for her watching from a wheelchair, her performances there were so successful that her run was extended an extra week. Later that year, she returned to the Palace Theatre, site of her two-a-day triumph. She opened in September, once again to rave reviews and popular acclaim.

In November 1959, Garland was hospitalized after she was diagnosed with acute hepatitis. Over the next few weeks, several quarts of fluid were drained from her body until she was released from the hospital in January 1960, still in a weak condition. She was told by doctors that she probably had five years or less to live and that, even if she did survive, she would be a semi-invalid and would never sing again. She initially felt "greatly relieved" at the diagnosis. "The pressure was off me for the first time in my life." However, she recovered over the next several months and in August of that year, returned to the stage of the Palladium. She felt so warmly embraced by the British that she announced her intention to move permanently to England.

At the beginning of 1960, Garland signed a contract with Random House to write her autobiography. The book was to be called The Judy Garland Story and to be a collaboration with Fred F. Finklehoffe. Garland was paid an advance of $35,000 and she and Finklehoffe recorded conversations about her life to be used in producing a manuscript. Garland worked on her autobiography on and off throughout the 1960s, but never completed it. Portions of her unfinished autobiography were included in the 2014 biography, Judy Garland on Judy Garland: Interviews and Encounters by Randy L. Schmidt.

Her concert appearance at Carnegie Hall on April 23, 1961, was a considerable highlight, called by many "the greatest night in show business history". The two-record album Judy at Carnegie Hall was certified gold, charting for 95 weeks on Billboard, including 13 weeks at number one. It won four Grammy Awards, including Album of the Year and Best Female Vocal of the Year.

The Judy Garland Show

In 1961, Garland and CBS settled their contract disputes with the help of her new agent, Freddie Fields and negotiated a new round of specials. The first, titled The Judy Garland Show, aired on February 25, 1962 and featured guests Frank Sinatra and Dean Martin. Following this success, CBS made a $24 million offer (equivalent to $ million in ) to her for a weekly television series of her own, also to be called The Judy Garland Show, which was deemed at the time in the press to be "the biggest talent deal in TV history". Although she had said as early as 1955 that she would never do a weekly television series, in the early 1960s, she was in a financially precarious situation. She was several hundred thousand dollars in debt to the Internal Revenue Service, having failed to pay taxes in 1951 and 1952 and the failure of A Star is Born meant that she received nothing from that investment.

Following a third special, Judy Garland and Her Guests Phil Silvers and Robert Goulet, Garland's weekly series debuted September 29, 1963. The Judy Garland Show was critically praised, but for a variety of reasons (including being placed in the time slot opposite Bonanza on NBC), the show lasted only one season and was cancelled in 1964 after 26 episodes. Despite its short run, the series was nominated for four Emmy Awards, including Best Variety Series.

During this time, Garland had a six-month affair with actor Glenn Ford. Garland's biographer Gerald Clarke, Ford's son Peter, singer Mel Tormé and her husband Sid Luft wrote about the affair in their respective biographies. The relationship began in 1963 while Garland was doing her television show. Ford would attend tapings of the show sitting in the front row while Garland sang. Ford is credited with giving Garland one of the more stable relationships of her later life. The affair was ended by Ford (a notorious womanizer, according to Peter Ford) when he realized Garland wanted to marry him.

Political views
Garland was a life-long and relatively active Democrat. During her lifetime, she was a member of the Hollywood Democratic committee and a financial and moral supporter of various causes, including the Civil Rights Movement. She donated money to the campaigns of Democratic presidential candidates Franklin D. Roosevelt, Adlai Stevenson II, John F. Kennedy and Robert F. Kennedy and Progressive candidate Henry A. Wallace.

In April of 1944, Garland escorted Brigadier General Benjamin O. Davis, Sr. to a reception honoring the general at the home of Ira Gershwin.  Davis, the first Black general and highest-ranking Black officer in the U.S. military, was in Los Angeles for the premiere of Frank Capra's documentary about Black Americans serving in World War II.  In September 1947, Garland joined the Committee for the First Amendment, a group formed by Hollywood celebrities in support of the Hollywood Ten during the hearings of the House Un-American Activities Committee (HUAC), an investigative committee of the United States House of Representatives led by J. Parnell Thomas.  HUAC was formed to investigate alleged disloyalty and subversive activities on the part of private citizens, public employees and organizations suspected of having communist ties. The Committee for the First Amendment sought to protect the civil liberties of those accused.

Other members included Humphrey Bogart, Lauren Bacall, Dorothy Dandridge, John Garfield, Katharine Hepburn, Lena Horne, John Huston, Gene Kelly and Billy Wilder.  Garland took part in recording an all-star radio broadcast on October 26, 1947, Hollywood Fights Back, during which she exhorted listeners to action: "Before every free conscience in America is subpoenaed, please speak up! Say your piece! Write your congressman a letterair mail special. Let the Congress know what you think of its Un-American Committee."

Garland was a friend of President John F. Kennedy and his wife Jacqueline Kennedy and she often vacationed in Hyannis Port, Massachusetts. The house she stayed in during her vacations in Hyannis Port is known today as The Judy Garland House because of her association with the property. Garland would call Kennedy weekly, often ending her phone calls by singing the first few bars of "Over the Rainbow".

On August 28, 1963, Garland and other prominent celebrities such as Josephine Baker, Sidney Poitier, Lena Horne, Paul Newman, Rita Moreno and Sammy Davis, Jr. took part in the March on Washington for Jobs and Freedom, a demonstration organized to advocate for the civil and economic rights of African Americans.  She had been photographed by the press in Los Angeles earlier in the month alongside Eartha Kitt, Marlon Brando and Charlton Heston as they planned their participation in the march on the nation's capital.

On September 16, 1963, Garlandalong with daughter Liza Minnelli, Carolyn Jones, June Allyson and Allyson's daughter Pam Powellheld a press conference to protest the recent bombing of the 16th Street Baptist Church in Birmingham, Alabama, that resulted in the death of four young African American girls. They expressed their shock and outrage at the attack and requested funds for the families of the victims. Pam Powell and Liza Minnelli both announced their intention to attend the funeral of the victims during the press conference.

Final years

In 1963, Garland sued Sidney Luft for divorce on the grounds of mental cruelty. She also asserted that he had repeatedly struck her while he was drinking and that he had attempted to take their children from her by force. She had filed for divorce from Luft on several previous occasions, even as early as 1956, but they had reconciled each time.

After her television series was canceled, Garland returned to work on the stage. She returned to the London Palladium performing with 18-year-old daughter Liza Minnelli in November 1964. The concert was also shown on the British television network ITV and it was one of her final appearances at the venue. She made guest appearances on The Ed Sullivan Show and The Tonight Show. Garland guest-hosted an episode of The Hollywood Palace with Vic Damone. She was invited back for a second episode in 1966 with Van Johnson as her guest. Problems with Garland's behavior ended her Hollywood Palace guest appearances.

A 1964 tour of Australia ended badly. Garland's first two concerts in Sydney were held in the Sydney Stadium because no concert hall could accommodate the overflow crowds who wanted to see her. Both went well and received positive reviews. Her third performance, in Melbourne, started an hour late. The crowd of 7,000 was angered by her tardiness and believed that she was drunk; they booed and heckled her and she fled the stage after 45 minutes. She later characterized the Melbourne crowd as "brutish".  Garland's Melbourne appearance gained a negative press response.

Garland's tour promoter Mark Herron announced that they had married aboard a freighter off the coast of Hong Kong. However, she was not officially divorced from Luft at the time the ceremony was performed. The divorce became final on May 19, 1965, and she and Herron did not legally marry until November 14, 1965; they separated five months later. During their divorce, Garland testified that Herron had beaten her. Herron claimed that he "only hit her in self defense".

For much of her career throughout the 1950s and early 1960s, husband Sidney Luft had been her manager. However, Garland eventually parted ways with Luft professionally, signing with agents Freddie Fields and David Begelman. By the fall of 1966, Garland had also parted ways with Fields and Begelman. Fields's and Begelman's mismanagement of Garland's money, as well as their embezzlement of much of her earnings, resulted in her owing around $500,000 in total in personal debts and in debts to the IRS. The IRS placed tax liens on her home in Brentwood, Los Angeles, her recording contract with Capitol Records and any other business dealings in which she could derive an income.

Garland was left in a desperate situation that saw her sell her Brentwood home at a price far below its value. She was then cast in February 1967 in the role of Helen Lawson in Valley of the Dolls by 20th Century Fox. According to co-star Patty Duke, Garland was treated poorly by director Mark Robson on the set of Valley of the Dolls and was primarily hired so as to augment publicity for the film. After Garland's dismissal from the film, author Jacqueline Susann said in the 1967 television documentary Jacqueline Susann and the Valley of the Dolls, "I think Judy will always come back. She kids about making a lot of comebacks, but I think Judy has a kind of a thing where she has to get to the bottom of the rope and things have to get very, very rough for her. Then with an amazing inner strength that only comes of a certain genius, she comes back bigger than ever".

Returning to the stage, Garland made one of her last U.S. appearances at New York's Palace Theatre in July 1967, a 27-show stand, performing with her children Lorna and Joey Luft. She wore a sequined pantsuit on stage for this tour, which was part of the original wardrobe for her character in Valley of the Dolls. Garland earned more than $200,000 from her final run at New York's Palace Theatre from her 75% share of the profits generated by her engagement there. On closing night at the Palace, federal tax agents seized the majority of her earnings.

By early 1969, Garland's health had deteriorated. She performed in London at the Talk of the Town nightclub for a five-week run in which she was paid £2,500 per week, and made her last concert appearance in Copenhagen during March 1969. After her divorce from Herron had been finalized on February 11, she married her fifth and final husband, nightclub manager Mickey Deans, at Chelsea Register Office, London, on March 15.

Death

On June 22, 1969, Garland was found dead in the bathroom of her rented house in Cadogan Lane, Belgravia, London. At the inquest, Coroner Gavin Thurston stated that the cause of death was "an incautious self-overdosage" of barbiturates; her blood contained the equivalent of ten  Seconal capsules. Thurston stressed that the overdose had been unintentional and no evidence suggested that she had intended to kill herself. Garland's autopsy showed no inflammation of her stomach lining and no drug residue in her stomach, which indicated that the drug had been ingested over a long period of time, rather than in a single dose. Her death certificate stated that her death was "accidental". Supporting the accidental cause, Garland's physician noted that a prescription of 25 barbiturate pills was found by her bedside half-empty and another bottle of 100 barbiturate pills was still unopened.

A British specialist who had attended Garland's autopsy stated that she had nevertheless been living on borrowed time owing to cirrhosis, although a second autopsy conducted later reported no evidence of alcoholism or cirrhosis. Her Wizard of Oz co-star Ray Bolger commented at her funeral, "She just plain wore out." Forensic pathologist Jason Payne-James believed that Garland had an eating disorder (psychologist Linda Papadopoulos asserted that it was probably bulimia nervosa), which contributed to her death.

After Garland's body had been embalmed and clothed in the same gray, silk gown she wore at her wedding to Deans, Deans traveled with her remains to New York City on June 26, 1969, where an estimated 20,000 people lined up to pay their respects at the Frank E. Campbell Funeral Chapel in Manhattan, which remained open all night long to accommodate the overflowing crowd. On June 27, 1969, James Mason gave a eulogy at the funeral, an Episcopal service led by the Rev. Peter Delaney of St Marylebone Parish Church, London, who had officiated at her marriage to Deans, three months earlier. "Judy's great gift", Mason said in his eulogy, "was that she could wring tears out of hearts of rock... She gave so richly and so generously, that there was no currency in which to repay her." The public and press were barred.

Years of mismanagement of her financial affairs by her representatives and staff along with her generosity toward her family and various causes resulted in her poor financial situation at the end of her life. In her last will, signed and sealed in early 1961, Garland made many generous bequests that could not be fulfilled because her estate had been in debt for many years. Her daughter, Liza Minnelli, worked to pay off her mother's debts with the help of family friend Frank Sinatra. In 1978, a selection of Garland's personal items was auctioned off by her ex-husband Sidney Luft with the support of their daughter Lorna Luft and their son Joey. Almost 500 items, ranging from copper cookware to musical arrangements, were offered for sale. The auction raised  for her heirs.

Artistry and recognition

Garland possessed a contralto singing voice, described as brassy, powerful, effortless and resonant, often demonstrating a tremulous, powerful vibrato. Although her range was comparatively limited, Garland was capable of alternating between female and male-sounding timbres with little effort. The Richmond Times-Dispatch correspondent Tony Farrell wrote she possessed "a deep, velvety contralto voice that could turn on a dime to belt out the high notes". Ron O'Brien, producer of tribute album The Definitive Collection – Judy Garland (2006), wrote the singer's combination of natural phrasing, elegant delivery, mature pathos "and powerful dramatic dynamics she brings to ... songs make her [renditions] the definitive interpretations". 

The Huffington Post writer Joan E. Dowlin called the period of Garland's music career between 1937 and 1945 the "innocent years", during which the critic believes the singer's "voice was vibrant and her musical expression exuberant", taking note of its resonance and distinct, "rich yet sweet" quality "that grabs you and pulls you in". Garland's voice would often vary to suit the song she was interpreting, ranging from soft, engaging and tender during ballads to humorous on some of her duets with other artists. Her more joyful, belted performances have been compared to entertainers Sophie Tucker, Ethel Merman and Al Jolson. Although her musical repertoire consisted largely of cast recordings, show tunes and traditional pop standards, Garland was also capable of singing soul, blues and jazz music, which Dowlin compared to singer Elvis Presley.

Garland always claimed that her talent as a performer was inherited, saying: "Nobody ever taught me what to do onstage." Critics agree that, even when she debuted as a child, Garland had always sounded mature for her age, particularly on her earlier recordings. From an early age, Garland had been billed as "the little girl with the leather lungs", a designation the singer later admitted to having felt humiliated by because she would have much preferred to have been known to audiences as a "pretty" or "nice little girl".

Jessel recalled that, even at only 12 years old, Garland's singing voice resembled that of "a woman with a heart that had been hurt". The Kansas City Star contributor Robert Trussel cited Garland's singing voice among the reasons why her role in The Wizard of Oz remains memorable, writing that although "She might have been made up and costumed to look like a little girl ... she didn't sing like one" due to her "powerful contralto command[ing] attention".

Camille Paglia, writing for The New York Times, joked that even in Garland's adult life, "her petite frame literally throbbed with her huge voice", making it appear as though she were "at war with her own body". Theater actress and director Donna Thomason stated that Garland was an "effective" performer because she was capable of using her "singing voice [as] a natural extension of [her] speaking voice", a skill that Thomason believes all musical theater actors should at least strive to achieve. Trussel agreed that "Garland's singing voice sounded utterly natural. It never seemed forced or overly trained."

Writing for Turner Classic Movies, biographer Jonathan Riggs observed that Garland had a tendency to imbue her vocals with a paradoxical combination of "fragility and resilience" that eventually became a signature trademark of hers. This signature style of her performances used to be marked with power in her voice, pronounced enunciation and projecting a sense of vulnerability through her singing and body language. Michael Bronski writes in his book, Culture Clash, There was a hurt in her voice and an immediacy to her performance that gave the impression that it was her pain. Louis Bayard of The Washington Post described Garland's voice as "throbbing", believing it to be capable of "connect[ing] with [audiences] in a way no other voice does". Bayard also believes that listeners "find it hard to disentwine the sorrow in her voice from the sorrow that dogged her life", while Dowlin argued that, "Listening to Judy sing ... makes me forget all of the angst and suffering she must have endured."

The New York Times obituarist in 1969 observed that Garland, whether intentionally or not, "brought with her ... all the well-publicized phantoms of her emotional breakdown, her career collapses and comebacks" on stage during later performances. The same writer said that Garland's voice changed and lost some of its quality as she aged, although she retained much of her personality. Contributing to the Irish Independent, Julia Molony observed Garland's voice, although "still rich with emotion", had finally begun to "creak with the weight of years of disappointment and hard-living" by the time she performed at Carnegie Hall in 1961.

Similarly, the live record's entry in the Library of Congress wrote that "while her voice was still strong, it had also gained a bit of heft and a bit of wear"; author Cary O'Dell believes Garland's rasp and "occasional quiver" only "upped the emotional quotient of many of her numbers", particularly on her signature songs "Over the Rainbow" and "The Man That Got Away". Garland stated that she always felt most safe and at home while performing onstage, regardless of the condition of her voice. Her musical talent has been commended by her peers; opera singer Maria Callas once said that Garland possessed "the most superb voice she had ever heard", while singer and actor Bing Crosby said that "no other singer could be compared to her" when Garland was rested.

Garland was known for interacting with her audiences during live performances; The New York Times obituarist wrote that Garland possessed "a seemingly unquenchable need for her audiences to respond with acclaim and affection. And often, they did, screaming, 'We love you, Judy – we love you.'" Garland herself explained in 1961: "A really great reception makes me feel like I have a great big warm heating pad all over me ... I truly have a great love for an audience and I used to want to prove it to them by giving them blood. But I have a funny new thing now, a real determination to make people enjoy the show."

The New York Times writer described her as both "an instinctive actress and comedienne". The anonymous contributor commented that Garland's performance style resembled that of "a music hall performer in an era when music halls were obsolete". Close friends of Garland's insisted that she never truly wanted to be a movie star and would have much rather devoted her career entirely to singing and recording records. AllMusic biographer William Ruhlmann believes that Garland's ability to maintain a successful career as a recording artist even after her film appearances became less frequent was unusual for an artist at the time.

Garland has been identified as a triple threat due to her ability to sing, act and dance, arguably equally well. Doug Strassler, a critic for the New York Press, described Garland as a "triple threat" who "bounced between family musicals and adult dramas with a precision and a talent that remains largely unmatched". In terms of acting, Peter Lennon, writing for The Guardian in 1999, identified Garland as a "chameleon" due to her ability to alternate between comedic, musical and dramatic roles, citing The Wizard of Oz, The Clock, A Star is Born and I Could Go On Singing – her final film role – as prominent examples. Michael Musto, a journalist for W magazine, wrote that in her film roles Garland "could project decency, vulnerability and spunk like no other star and she wrapped it up with a tremulously beautiful vocal delivery that could melt even the most hardened troll".

Filmography

Discography

Studio albums
The Judy Garland Souvenir Album (1940)
Second Souvenir Album (1943)
Miss Show Business (1955)
Judy (1956)
Alone (1957)
Judy in Love (1958)
The Letter (1959)
That's Entertainment! (1960)
The Garland Touch (1962)

Public image and reputation
Garland was nearly as famous for her personal struggles in everyday life as she was for her entertainment career. She has been closely associated with her carefully cultivated girl next door image. Early in her career during the 1930s, Garland's public image had earned her the title "America's favorite kid sister", as well as the title "Little Miss Showbusiness".

In a review for the Star Tribune, Graydon Royce wrote that Garland's public image remained that of "a Midwestern girl who couldn't believe where she was", despite having been a well-established celebrity for over 20 years. Royce believes that fans and audiences insisted on preserving their memory of Garland as Dorothy no matter how much she matured, calling her "a captive not of her own desire to stay young, but a captive of the public's desire to preserve her that way". Thus, the studio continued to cast Garland in roles that were significantly younger than her actual age.

According to Malony, Garland was one of Hollywood's hardest-working performers during the 1940s, which Malony claims she used as a coping mechanism after her first marriage imploded. However, studio employees recall that Garland had a tendency to be quite intense, headstrong and volatile; Judy Garland: The Secret Life of an American Legend author David Shipman claims that several individuals were frustrated by Garland's "narcissism" and "growing instability", while millions of fans found her public demeanor and psychological state to be "fragile", appearing neurotic in interviews.

MGM reports that Garland was consistently tardy and demonstrated erratic behavior, which resulted in several delays and disruptions to filming schedules until she was finally dismissed from the studio, which had deemed her unreliable and difficult to manage. Farrell called Garland "A grab bag of contradictions" which "has always been a feast for the American imagination", describing her public persona as "awkward yet direct, bashful yet brash". Describing the singer as "Tender and endearing yet savage and turbulent", Paglia wrote that Garland "cut a path of destruction through many lives. And out of that chaos, she made art of still-searing intensity." Calling her "a creature of extremes, greedy, sensual and demanding, gluttonous for pleasure and pain", Paglia also compared Garland to entertainer Frank Sinatra due to their shared "emblematic personality ... into whom the mass audience projected its hopes and disappointments", while observing that she lacked Sinatra's survival skills.

Despite her success as a performer, Garland suffered from low self-esteem, particularly with regard to her weight, which she constantly dieted to maintain at the behest of the studio and Mayer; critics and historians believe this was a result of having been told that she was an "ugly duckling" by studio executives. Entertainment Weekly columnist Gene Lyons observed that both audiences and fellow members of the entertainment industry "tended either to love her or to hate her".

At one point, Stevie Phillips, who had worked as an agent for Garland for four years, described her client as "a demented, demanding, supremely talented drug-addict". Royce argues that Garland maintained "astonishing strength and courage", even during difficult times. English actor Dirk Bogarde once called Garland "the funniest woman I have ever met". Ruhlmann wrote that the singer's personal life "contrasted so starkly with the exuberance and innocence of her film roles".

Despite her personal struggles, Garland disagreed with the public's opinion that she was a tragic figure. Her younger daughter Lorna agreed that Garland "hated" being referred to as a tragic figure, explaining, "We all have tragedies in our lives, but that does not make us tragic. She was funny and she was warm and she was wonderfully gifted. She had great highs and great moments in her career. She also had great moments in her personal life. Yes, we lost her at 47 years old. That was tragic. But she was not a tragic figure." Ruhlmann argues that Garland actually used the public's opinion of her tragic image to her advantage towards the end of her career.

Honors and legacy

By the time of her death in 1969, Garland had appeared in more than 35 films. She has been called one of the greats of entertainment and her reputation has endured. In 1992, Gerald Clarke of Architectural Digest dubbed Garland "probably the greatest American entertainer of the twentieth century". O'Brien believes that "No one in the history of Hollywood ever packed the musical wallop that Garland did", explaining, "She had the biggest, most versatile voice in movies. Her Technicolor musicals... defined the genre. The songs she introduced were Oscar gold. Her film career frames the Golden Age of Hollywood musicals."

Turner Classic Movies dubbed Garland "history's most poignant voice". Entertainment Weekly's Gene Lyons dubbed Garland "the Madonna of her generation". The American Film Institute named her eighth among the Greatest female stars of Golden Age Hollywood cinema. In June 1998, in The New York Times, Camille Paglia wrote, "Garland was a personality on the grand scale who makes our current crop of pop stars look lightweight and evanescent."

In recent years, Garland's legacy has maintained fans of all different ages, both younger and older. In 2010, The Huffington Post contributor Joan E. Dowlin concluded that Garland possessed a distinct "it" quality by "exemplif[ying] the star quality of charisma, musical talent, natural acting ability and, despite what the studio honchos said, good looks (even if they were the girl next door looks)".

AllMusic's biographer William Ruhlmann said that "the core of her significance as an artist remains her amazing voice and emotional commitment to her songs" and believes that "her career is sometimes viewed more as an object lesson in Hollywood excess than as the remarkable string of multimedia accomplishments it was". In 2012, Strassler described Garland as "more than an icon... Like Charlie Chaplin and Lucille Ball, she created a template that the powers that be have forever been trying, with varied levels of success, to replicate."

Garland's live performances towards the end of her career are still remembered by fans who attended them as "peak moments in 20th-century music". She has been the subject of over thirty biographies since her death, including the well-received Me and My Shadows: A Family Memoir by her daughter, Lorna Luft, whose memoir was later adapted into the television miniseries Life with Judy Garland: Me and My Shadows, which won Emmy Awards for the two actresses who portrayed her (Tammy Blanchard and Judy Davis). Strassler observed that Garland "created one of the most storied cautionary tales in the industry, thanks to her many excesses and insecurities that led to her early death by overdose".

Garland was posthumously awarded the Grammy Lifetime Achievement Award in 1997. Several of her recordings have been inducted into the Grammy Hall of Fame. These include "Over the Rainbow", which was ranked as the number one movie song of all time in the American Film Institute's "100 Years...100 Songs" list. Four more Garland songs are featured on the list: "Have Yourself a Merry Little Christmas" (No. 76), "Get Happy" (No. 61), "The Trolley Song" (No. 26) and "The Man That Got Away" (No. 11).

She has twice been honored on U.S. postage stamps, in 1989 (as Dorothy) and again in 2006 (as Vicki Lester from A Star Is Born). While on tour in 1964, Garland identified "Over the Rainbow" as her favorite of all the songs she had ever recorded, to which Trussel observed that "Her career would remain inextricably linked". Garland would frequently use an overture from "Over the Rainbow" as her entrance music during concerts and television appearances.

According to Paglia, the more Garland performed "Over the Rainbow", the more it "became her tragic anthem ... a dirge for artistic opportunities squandered and for personal happiness permanently deferred". In 1998, Carnegie Hall hosted a two-concert tribute to Garland, which they promoted as "a tribute to the world's greatest entertainer".

Subsequent celebrities who have suffered from personal struggles with drug addiction and substance use disorder have been compared to Garland, particularly Michael Jackson. Garland's elder daughter Liza Minnelli had a personal life that was almost parallel to that of her mother's, having struggled with substance use disorder and several unsuccessful marriages. Paglia observed that actress Marilyn Monroe would exhibit behavior which was similar to that which Garland had exhibited a decade earlier in Meet Me in St. Louis, particularly tardiness.

On June 10, 2022, the anniversary of her centennial, she was honored with a fragrance named after her entitled "Judy — A Garland Fragrance" created by Vincenzo Spinnato.

Gay icon

Garland had a large fan base in the gay community and became a gay icon. Reasons given for her standing among gay men are the admiration of her ability as a performer, the way her personal struggles mirrored those of gay men in the United States during the height of her fame and her value as a camp figure. In the 1960s, a reporter asked how she felt about having a large gay following. She replied, "I couldn't care less. I sing to people!"

Portrayals in fiction

Garland has been portrayed on television by Andrea McArdle in Rainbow (1978), Tammy Blanchard (young Judy) and Judy Davis (older Judy) in Life with Judy Garland: Me and My Shadows (2001), and Sigrid Thornton in Peter Allen: Not The Boy Next Door (2015). Harvey Weinstein optioned Get Happy: The Life of Judy Garland and a stage show and film based on it were slated to star Anne Hathaway. Renée Zellweger portrayed Garland in the biopic Judy (2019) and won the Academy Award for Best Actress.

On stage, Garland is a character in the musical The Boy from Oz (1998), portrayed by Chrissy Amphlett in the original Australian production and by Isabel Keating on Broadway in 2003. End of the Rainbow (2005) featured Caroline O'Connor as Garland and Paul Goddard as Garland's pianist. Adrienne Barbeau played Garland in The Property Known as Garland (2006) and The Judy Monologues (2010) initially featured male actors reciting Garland's words before it was revamped as a one-woman show.

In music, Garland is referenced in the 1992 Tori Amos song "Happy Phantom", in which Garland is imagined to be taking Buddha by the hand. Amos also refers to Garland as "Judy G" in her 1996 song "Not the Red Baron".

See also
 List of recordings by Judy Garland

References

Bibliography

Further reading

External links

 
 The Judy Room
 Judy-Garland.org 
 Judy Garland Museum
 
 
 Judy Garland at The Biography Channel
 
 
 Judy Garland: By Myself  American Masters special
 

 
1922 births
1969 deaths
20th-century American actresses
20th-century American Episcopalians
20th-century American singers
20th-century American women singers
Academy Juvenile Award winners
Accidental deaths in London
Actresses from Los Angeles
Actresses from Minnesota
American child actresses
American child singers
American contraltos
American expatriates in England
American female dancers
American film actresses
American musical theatre actresses
American people of English descent
American people of French descent
American people of Irish descent
American people of Scottish descent
American radio personalities
American stage actresses
American tap dancers
American television actresses
American voice actresses
American women pop singers
Barbiturates-related deaths
Best Musical or Comedy Actress Golden Globe (film) winners
Burials at Ferncliff Cemetery
Burials at Hollywood Forever Cemetery
California Democrats
Capitol Records artists
Cecil B. DeMille Award Golden Globe winners
Child pop musicians
Decca Records artists
Drug-related deaths in England
Grammy Award winners
Grammy Lifetime Achievement Award winners
Hollywood High School alumni
Metro-Goldwyn-Mayer contract players
New York (state) Democrats
People from Grand Rapids, Minnesota
People from Lancaster, California
Singers from Los Angeles
Singers from Minnesota
Special Tony Award recipients
Torch singers
Traditional pop music singers
United Service Organizations entertainers
Vaudeville performers
Austen Riggs Center patients